Rafael de Carvalho França (born 17 March 1998) is a Brazilian footballer who plays as a right back.

Career statistics

Club

Notes

References

External links

1998 births
Living people
Brazilian footballers
Association football defenders
Campeonato Brasileiro Série A players
CR Vasco da Gama players
Footballers from Rio de Janeiro (city)